In mathematics, the Dynkin index  of a finite-dimensional highest-weight representation of a compact simple Lie algebra  with highest weight  is defined by

where  is the 'defining representation', which is most often taken to be the fundamental representation if the Lie algebra under consideration is a matrix Lie algebra. 

The notation  is the trace form on the representation . By Schur's lemma, since the trace forms are all invariant forms, they are related by constants, so the index is well-defined.

Since the trace forms are bilinear forms, we can take traces to obtain

where the Weyl vector

The expression  is the value of the quadratic Casimir in the representation . The index  is always a positive integer.

In the particular case where  is the highest root, so that  is the adjoint representation, the Dynkin index  is equal to the dual Coxeter number.

See also 
 Killing form

References
 Philippe Di Francesco, Pierre Mathieu, David Sénéchal, Conformal Field Theory, 1997 Springer-Verlag New York, 

Representation theory of Lie algebras